Sesto Campano is a comune (municipality) in the Province of Isernia in the Italian region Molise, located about  southwest of Campobasso and about  southwest of Isernia. 
 
The municipality is located in the south of its province, close to the borders of Molise with Campania and Lazio. It borders with the municipality Venafro and four others belonging to the Province of Caserta: Ciorlano, Mignano Monte Lungo, Pratella and Presenzano.

References

Cities and towns in Molise